Badersdorf is a municipality in Burgenland in the district of Oberwart in Austria.

Population

Politics
Of the 11 positions on the municipal council, the ÖVP has 7, and the SPÖ 4.

References

Cities and towns in Oberwart District